Mol is a town located in the Ada municipality, in the North Banat District of Serbia. It is situated in the Autonomous Province of Vojvodina. The town has a Hungarian ethnic majority (62.14%) and it has a population of 6,009 
(2011 census).

Ethnic groups (2002 census)
Hungarians = 4,217 (62.14%)
Serbs = 2,189 (32.26%)
Roma = 153 (2.26%)
others

Historical population

1948: 8,275
1953: 8,121
1961: 8,097
1971: 8,128
1981: 7,950
1991: 7,522
2002: 6,786
2011: 6,009

Notable citizens
Norbert Könyves (1989– ), born in Senta, professional footballer who plays for Hungarian club Zalaegerszegi TE
László Moholy-Nagy (1895–1946), Hungarian architect, painter and photographer, notable professor of the Bauhaus school
Jovan Radonić (1873–1956), historian, member of Serbian Academy of Sciences and Arts
Novak Radonić (1826–1890), painter and writer
Gligorije Trlajić (1766–1811), writer and professor of law

See also
List of places in Serbia
List of cities, towns and villages in Vojvodina

References

Popis stanovništva, domaćinstava i stanova 2002. Knjiga 1: Nacionalna ili etnička pripadnost po naseljima. Republika Srbija, Republički zavod za statistiku Beograd 2003. 
Slobodan Ćurčić, Broj stanovnika Vojvodine, Novi Sad, 1996.

External links
 History of Mol 

Places in Bačka
Populated places in North Banat District
Ada, Serbia
Hungarian communities in Serbia
Towns in Serbia